Epacris lithophila is a species of flowering plant in the heath family Ericaceae and is endemic to a small area of New South Wales. It is an erect shrub with few branches, lance-shaped to elliptic leaves and creamy-white, tube-shaped flowers.

Description
Flowering occurs from November to December.

Taxonomy and naming
Epacris lithophila was first formally described in 1996 by Ron Crowden and Yvonne Menadue in the Annals of Botany based on plant material collected near Lawson in 1975. The specific epithet (lithophila) refers to the rocky habitat of this species.

Distribution and habitat
This epacris grows on sandstone rock or at the base of cliffs in dry forest at higher altitudes in the Blue Mountains of New South Wales.

References

lithophila
Ericales of Australia
Flora of New South Wales
Plants described in 1996